The Battle of Harlaw was a Scottish clan battle fought on 24 July 1411 just north of Inverurie in Aberdeenshire. It was one of a series of battles fought during the Middle Ages between the barons of northeast Scotland against those from the west coast.

The battle was fought to resolve competing claims to the Earldom of Ross, a large region of northern Scotland. Robert Stewart, Duke of Albany, Regent of Scotland, had taken control of the earldom as guardian of his niece Euphemia Leslie. This claim was contested by Donald, Lord of the Isles, who had married Euphemia's aunt Mariota. Donald invaded Ross with the intention of seizing the earldom by force.

First he defeated a large force of Mackays at the Battle of Dingwall. He captured Dingwall Castle and then advanced on Aberdeen with 10,000 clansmen. Near Inverurie he was met by 1,000–2,000 of the local gentry, many in armour, hastily assembled by the Earl of Mar. After a day of fierce fighting there was no clear victor; Donald had lost 900 men before retreating to the Western Isles, and Mar had lost 600. The latter could claim a strategic victory in that Aberdeen was saved, and within a year Albany had recaptured Ross and forced Donald to surrender. However Mariota was later awarded the earldom of Ross in 1424 and the Lordship of the Isles would keep the title for much of the 15th century.

The ferocity of the battle gave it the nickname "Red Harlaw". It is commemorated by a 40-foot (12 m) high memorial on the battlefield near Inverurie, supposedly by the church at Chapel of Garioch, and by ballads and music.

Background

During the Dark Ages, the territory of what later became Scotland was divided between the Gaelic kingdoms of Dál Riata on the western seaboard and Alba in the south-east, and Pictish kingdoms in the northeast of which Fortriu was the most important. In addition were the Anglo-Saxon Kingdom of Bernicia, later part of Northumbria, and the Brythonic Kingdom of Cumbria. Viking influence increased in the west, with the Norse-Gaels that became Lords of the Isles taking control of much of Dál Riata in 1156. The Gaels of Alba acquired Brythonic elements from the conquest of the Kingdom of Strathclyde in the 11th century and increasingly absorbed Norman-French and Anglo-Saxon culture, influences which also spread to the Pictish areas of the northeast. The lands of Fortriu became part of the Province of Moray, which was conquered by Alba in 1130 and fragmented into territories that were semi-independent of the king in Edinburgh.
 
There was a long history of conflicts between the Moray gentry and the clans of the West Coast, but some historians present Harlaw as a clash between the Scottish Highlands and Lowlands, or between Celt and Teuton. John Hill Burton (1809–1881) claimed that in Lowland Scotland Harlaw "was felt as a more memorable deliverance even than that of Bannockburn. What it was to be subject to England the country knew and disliked; to be subdued by their savage enemies of the mountains opened to them sources of terror of unknown character and extent". However Sir Robert Rait (1874–1936) detected no racial antipathy in the two contemporary accounts of the Scotichronicon and the Book of Pluscarden, and viewed Harlaw not as a conflict between races, but between two groups of Scots of which one spoke Scots and the other Gaelic. Rait mentions Buchanan's view that it was a raid for plunder.

Claims on the Earldom of Ross
The Earldom of Ross was a vast territory reaching from Skye to Ross and Inverness-shire, with superiority over the outlying lands of Nairn and Aberdeenshire. In 1370 Uilleam (William), Earl of Ross received a charter from King David II, confirming his right to the title and directing that in the absence of male heirs, the entirety of the earldom, titles and lands would fall to "the elder daughter always" without division. Uilleam died in 1372 without a male heir, and the title passed to his daughter Euphemia. By her first husband Sir Walter Leslie, Euphemia had two children – Alexander Leslie and Mariota (anglicised as Margaret or Mary). After Walter's death, Euphemia married Alexander Stewart, Earl of Buchan (the "Wolf of Badenoch") in 1382, giving the Stewarts control of the earldom. In 1392 the marriage was annulled as Buchan had long been living with Mairead inghean Eachainn with whom he had a number of children, including Alexander Stewart, Earl of Mar. Euphemia died in 1394 and her son Alexander Leslie inherited the title.

Robert Stewart, Duke of Albany had taken effective control of mainland Scotland towards the end of the reign of his father Robert II; his power increased during the reign (1390–1406) of his ineffective elder brother Robert III. Albany's daughter Isabel Stewart married Alexander Leslie before 1398 and their only child was a sickly daughter, also called Euphemia. According to the Calendar of Fearn, Leslie died on 8 May 1402, whilst his daughter was still a minor. Albany gained wardship of Euphemia, which gave him control of Ross. After the capture by the English of Robert III's heir James and Robert's death soon afterwards in April 1406, Albany was confirmed as regent; Albany continued to govern Scotland until his death in September 1420.

Meanwhile, Donald (Domhnall), Lord of the Isles claimed the earldom of Ross through his marriage to Euphemia's aunt, Mariota, the oldest living female descendant of Uilleam. He also signed an alliance with Henry IV of England on 16 September 1405, which was renewed on 8 May 1408. Skene believed the treaty of 1408 to be the key to the Harlaw campaign and that the claim on Ross was no more than a pretext for coordinated hostilities by Donald and the English against the Lowlands of Scotland, a plan abandoned after Harlaw.

Invasion and the Battle of Dingwall
It took Donald time to ready his assault, but in 1411 he assembled his forces at Ardtornish Castle on the Sound of Mull and invaded Ross. He met no opposition until "a severe conflict" at Dingwall, seat of the Earls of Ross, where, at the Battle of Dingwall, he fought a large body of men of the Clan Mackay from "Strathnaver". Their leader Angus-Dow (Angus Dubh, Angus Duff) Mackay was captured and his brother Rory-Gald was killed along with "the greater part of his men"; Donald later gave Angus his daughter in marriage. Donald then captured Dingwall Castle.

Donald assembled his army at Inverness, and summoned all the fighting men in Boyne and Enzie (northern Banffshire between the Rivers Deveron and Spey) to join his army. He then swept through Moray meeting little or no resistance. He then turned south-east, following roughly the route of the modern A96 road although the main road ran north of the River Urie, not south as it does today. Donald's men committed "great excesses" in Strathbogie and the Garioch, which belonged to Alexander Stewart, Earl of Mar. Finally the Highland horde came to Bennachie, the last hill of the Grampians before the coastal plain between Inverurie and Aberdeen. Donald had often promised to burn Aberdeen, and he was now within  of the burgh. On 23 July 1411, he set up camp just north of Inverurie, on high ground 2 km northwest of the bridge over the River Urie.

The Earl of Mar had plenty of warning of their advance, and had assembled a force from among the gentry of Buchan, Angus and the Mearns (Kincardineshire). The Irvings, Maules, Moray, Straitons, Lesleys, Stirlings and Lovels were led by their respective clan chiefs. Mar gathered his troops at Inverurie, a strategic town on the Inverness-Aberdeen road, and on the morning of 24 July marched northwest to meet the invaders.

Battle
According to the Scotichronicon, the two armies joined battle on the eve of the feast of St James – 24 July 1411. The same source puts Donald's army at 10,000 islanders and men of Ross, although it was probably far less. They were armed with swords, bows and axes, short knives, and round targe shields. 
It is likely that most ordinary highlanders would have worn no armour, if anything, a padded gambeson, known as a cotun. Wealthier highlanders would have been equipped in a similar way to the gallowglasses of Ireland and the Isles, with long padded gambesons, mail hauberks, and sometimes partial plate.
Tradition has it that they faced a force numbering between 1,000 and 2,000 men; it was probably several thousand, with significant numbers of knights. Sir Gilbert de Greenlaw died at Harlaw and his tombstone at Kinkell Church gives an idea of how Mar's knights were equipped. Sir Gilbert carries a hand and a half sword and wears an open-faced bascinet helmet with a mail-reinforced arming doublet beneath plate armour. Mar's men also carried spears, maces, and battle axes. Tradition has it that the black armour in the entrance hall of Aberdeen's Town House belonged to Robert Davidson, Provost of Aberdeen, who died in the battle along with most of the burgesses.

On spotting the islanders, Mar organised his force into battle array, with the main army behind a small advance guard of men-at-arms under Sir James Scrymgeour (Constable of Dundee, the hereditary standard-bearer of Scotland) and Sir Alexander Ogilvie of Auchterhouse (Sheriff of Angus). He probably split the army into three, with the knights as a cavalry reserve and the infantry arranged in schiltrons, close-packed arrays of spearmen. There is no mention of significant numbers of archers. The islanders were arranged in the traditional cuneiform or wedge shape, with Hector MacLean commanding the right wing and the chief of Clan Mackintosh on the left. At first the clansmen launched themselves at Scrymgeour's men, but failed to make much impression on the armoured column and many were slain. However, every wave of islanders that was repulsed, was replaced by fresh men. Meanwhile, Mar led his knights into the main body of Donald's army with similar results. The islanders brought down the knights' horses and then used their dirks to finish off the riders.

By nightfall, the ballads claim that 600 of Mar's men were dead, including Ogilvie and his son, Scrymgeour, Sir Robert Maule, Sir Thomas Morrow, William Abernethy, Alexander Straiton of Lauriston, James Lovel, Alexander Stirling, and Sir Alexander Irvine of Drum; according to Maclean history the latter duelled with Hector Maclean until both were dead. Many families lost every male in their house; Lesley of Balquhain died with six of his sons. Donald lost 900 men, a much smaller proportion of his total force, but including his two seconds-in-command. In the history of the Mackintoshes, chiefs of Clan Chattan, it is recorded that Mackintosh mourned the loss of so many of his friends and people, especially of Clan Vean (Clan MacBean).

Too feeble to retreat, Mar and his surviving men camped on the battlefield, expecting combat to resume in the morning. At dawn they found that Donald had withdrawn during the night, retreating first to Ross and then back to the Isles. The casualties on both sides meant that neither side felt it had won the day, but Mar had kept Donald from Aberdeen and for the islanders, the absence of conclusive victory was as bad as defeat.

Aftermath

Many of those who died were buried at Kinkell Church south of Inverurie. The heirs of the slain Scots were exempt from death duties in the same way as heirs of those who died fighting the English. Suspecting that Donald had merely fallen back to rest and reinforce his troops, Albany collected an army and marched on Dingwall, seizing the castle and regaining control of Ross. In mid-1412 he followed up with a three-pronged attack on Donald's possessions, forcing Donald to surrender his claim on Ross, become a vassal of the Scottish crown and give up hostages against his future good behaviour. The treaty was signed at Polgilbe/Polgillip (Loch Gilp), an inlet of Loch Fyne in Argyll.

It was proposed on 3 June 1415 that Euphemia should marry Thomas Dunbar, 3rd (6th) Earl of Moray but the papal commission would not have arrived before she surrendered her land and titles (possibly under compulsion) to Albany's son the Earl of Buchan on 12 June 1415, after which she appears to have entered a nunnery. Buchan was killed at the Battle of Verneuil in 1424, and the rest of Albany's heirs were executed or exiled by James I on his return to Scotland. Mariota claimed the earldom of Ross once more, and James I awarded it to her in 1424. Donald's son Alexander succeeded to the title on her death in 1429.

After Harlaw, the Earl of Mar "ruled with acceptance nearly all the north of the country beyond the Mounth" according to the Scotichronicon. He entered into an "uneasy alliance" with his uncle Albany, but the ruin of Albany's heirs left Mar in control of the north. Alexander attempted an invasion of Ross in 1429 which led to his defeat and capture by Mar at the Battle of Lochaber. In turn Mar suffered a devastating defeat at the hands of Donald's nephew Donald Balloch, at the Battle of Inverlochy. The resulting power vacuum allowed Alexander to occupy Inverness and perhaps consider himself Earl of Ross by 1437; the title was officially confirmed by the new regent, the Earl of Douglas, after the death of James I that year.

Commemoration and archaeology
 
The battle is remembered as "one of the hardest fought that ever took place on Scottish soil"; the fighting was so fierce that the battle went down in history as "Red (Reid) Harlaw". The battle is commemorated in a march, The Battle of Harlaw, and in ballads such as Child ballad 163. Maidment has a different ballad which apparently shares the same tune, but he is sceptical of its antiquity. Sir Walter Scott mentions Harlaw in his 1816 novel The Antiquary, particularly in Elspeth's ballad in Chapter 40.

Tradition has it that Mar founded Chapel of Garioch after the battle, to celebrate masses for the souls of the fallen. In 1911, Aberdeen Town Council erected the Harlaw Monument, located to the north of the town of Inverurie, to the memory of Provost Robert Davidson and the burgesses of Aberdeen who died in the battle. There were once several cairns in the area that were traditionally associated with the battle, but little remains of them now – Drum's Cairn, Provost Davidson's Cairn, Donald's Tomb and the Liggars Stane. 12 human skeletons were uncovered northeast of Harlaw House in 1837. Although there have been several discoveries of prehistoric artefacts, such as stone axeheads and a flint core, no artefacts directly attributable to the battle have been recorded. The battlefield has been inventoried and protected by Historic Scotland under the Historic Environment (Amendment) Act 2011.

See also
 Battle of Lochaber – the final battle of a similar invasion by Donald's son in 1429
 History of Scotland
 Lord of the Isles
 Bonnie Rideout's album Harlaw, Scotland 1411 features music and commentary related to the Battle or Harlaw.

Notes and references

Bibliography
 
 
  – available online as the at Google Books (2007 Echo Library reprint and others), a Gutenberg e-book at Scribd and a poorly OCR'd text file at archive.org. Appendix A (pp. 108–12 of the Echo version) helpfully collects together the descriptions of the battle (in Latin) from Walter Bower (Scotichronicon Lib. xv, ch xxi), the Book of Pluscarden (Liber Pluscardensis Bk. x, ch. xxii), John Major/Mair (Historia Majoris Britanniae Bk. vi, ch. x), Hector Boece (Scotorum Historiae Lib. xvi) and George Buchanan (Rerum Scoticarum Historia Lib. x).
  – reprint of Chatto & Windus edition (1984).

Further reading
  The most modern account, Marren reviews primary and secondary sources.
 A comprehensive bibliography can be found in the Battlefields Trust report listed in the references.

External links
 
  Shows approximate deployments based on the work of Marren (1990).
 – MIDI version of Battle of Harlaw music
Ross Cowan, 'Late Medieval Scottish Swords', Medieval Warfare 1.2 (2011), short article about the types of swords used at Harlaw and other late medieval Scottish battles.

1411 in Scotland
15th-century Scottish clan battles
History of the Scottish Highlands
Battle of Harlaw
Battles involving Scotland
History of Aberdeenshire
Conflicts in 1411
Inventory of Historic Battlefields in Scotland
Inverurie